Andrey Mikhailovich Kulagin (4 September 1921 — 20 August 1980) was a Soviet fighter pilot who became a flying ace during World War II. Awarded the title Hero of the Soviet Union on 1 July 1944 for his initial victories, by the end of the war he totaled 30 solo and five shared shootdowns. After the end of the war he remained in the military, reaching the rank of colonel.

References 

1921 births
1980 deaths
Soviet World War II flying aces
Heroes of the Soviet Union
Recipients of the Order of Lenin
Recipients of the Order of the Red Banner
Recipients of the Order of Alexander Nevsky
Recipients of the Order of the Red Star